The Ninth Amendment (Amendment IX) to the United States Constitution addresses rights, retained by the people, that are not specifically enumerated in the Constitution. It is part of the Bill of Rights. The amendment was introduced during the drafting of the Bill of Rights when some of the American founders became concerned that future generations might argue that, because a certain right was not listed in the Bill of Rights, it did not exist. However, the Ninth Amendment has rarely played any role in U.S. constitutional law, and until the 1980s was often considered "forgotten" or "irrelevant" by many legal academics.

According to the U.S. Supreme Court, “If granted power is found, necessarily the objection of invasion of those rights, reserved by the Ninth and Tenth Amendments, must fail.”  Those granted powers are listed in the Constitution.  Whether the Supreme Court was correct or not is another question, and scholars have taken different positions.

Text

The amendment, as proposed by Congress in 1789 and later ratified as the Ninth Amendment, reads as follows:

Background before adoption

When the U.S. Constitution was put to the states for ratification after being signed on September 17, 1787, the Anti-Federalists argued that a Bill of Rights should be added. One of the arguments the Federalists gave against the addition of a Bill of Rights, during the debates about ratification of the Constitution, was that a listing of rights could problematically enlarge the powers specified in Article One, Section8 of the new Constitution by implication. For example, in Federalist 84, Alexander Hamilton asked, "Why declare that things shall not be done which there is no power to do?" Likewise, James Madison explained to Thomas Jefferson, "I conceive that in a certain degree... the rights in question are reserved by the manner in which the federal powers are granted" by Article One, Section8 of the Constitution.

The Anti-Federalists persisted in favor of a Bill of Rights during the ratification debates, but also were against ratification, and consequently several of the state ratification conventions gave their assent with accompanying resolutions proposing amendments to be added. In 1788, the Virginia Ratifying Convention attempted to solve the problem that Hamilton and the Federalists had identified by proposing a constitutional amendment specifying:

This proposal ultimately led to the Ninth Amendment. In 1789, while introducing to the House of Representatives nineteen draft Amendments, James Madison addressed what would become the Ninth Amendment as follows:

Like Alexander Hamilton, Madison was concerned that enumerating various rights could "enlarge the powers delegated by the constitution". To attempt to solve this problem, Madison submitted this draft to Congress:

This was an intermediate form of the Ninth Amendment that borrowed from the Virginia proposal, while foreshadowing the final version.

The final text of the Ninth Amendment, like Madison's draft, speaks of other rights than those enumerated in the Constitution. The character of those other rights was indicated by Madison in his speech introducing the Bill of Rights (emphasis added):

The First through Eighth Amendments address the means by which the federal government exercises its enumerated powers, while the Ninth Amendment addresses a "great residuum" of rights that have not been "thrown into the hands of the government", as Madison put it. The Ninth Amendment became part of the Constitution on December 15, 1791, upon ratification by three-fourths of the states.

The final form of the amendment ratified by the states is as follows:

Judicial interpretation

The Ninth Amendment has generally been regarded by the courts as negating any expansion of governmental power on account of the enumeration of rights in the Constitution, but the Amendment has not been regarded as further limiting governmental power. The U.S. Supreme Court explained this, in U.S. Public Workers v. Mitchell : "If granted power is found, necessarily the objection of invasion of those rights, reserved by the Ninth and Tenth Amendments, must fail."

The Supreme Court held in Barron v. Baltimore (1833) that the Bill of Rights was enforceable by the federal courts only against the federal government, not against the states. Thus, the Ninth Amendment originally applied only to the federal government, which is a government of enumerated powers.

Some jurists have asserted that the Ninth Amendment is relevant to the interpretation of the Fourteenth Amendment. Justice Arthur Goldberg (joined by Chief Justice Earl Warren and Justice William Brennan) expressed this view in a concurring opinion in the case of Griswold v. Connecticut (1965):

In support of his interpretation of the Ninth, Goldberg quoted from Madison's speech in the House of Representatives as well as from Alexander Hamilton's Federalist Paper No. 84:

But the two Justices who dissented in Griswold replied that Goldberg was mistaken to invoke the Ninth as authority. Hugo Black's dissent said:

And Potter Stewart's dissent said:

Since Griswold, some judges have tried to use the Ninth Amendment to justify judicially enforcing rights that are not enumerated. For example, the District Court that heard the case of Roe v. Wade ruled in favor of a "Ninth Amendment right to choose to have an abortion," although it stressed that the right was "not unqualified or unfettered." However, Justice William O. Douglas rejected that view; Douglas wrote that "The Ninth Amendment obviously does not create federally enforceable rights." See Doe v. Bolton (1973). Douglas joined the majority opinion of the U.S. Supreme Court in Roe, which stated that a federally enforceable right to privacy, "whether it be founded in the Fourteenth Amendment's concept of personal liberty and restrictions upon state action, as we feel it is, or, as the District Court determined, in the Ninth Amendment's reservation of rights to the people, is broad enough to encompass a woman's decision whether or not to terminate her pregnancy."

The Sixth Circuit Court of Appeals stated in Gibson v. Matthews, 926 F.2d 532, 537 (6th Cir. 1991) that the Ninth Amendment was intended to vitiate the maxim of expressio unius est exclusio alterius according to which the express mention of one thing excludes all others:

Scholarly interpretation

Professor Laurence Tribe shares the view that this amendment does not confer substantive rights: "It is a common error, but an error nonetheless, to talk of 'ninth amendment rights.' The ninth amendment is not a source of rights as such; it is simply a rule about how to read the Constitution."

In 2000, Harvard historian Bernard Bailyn gave a speech at the White House on the subject of the Ninth Amendment. He said that the Ninth Amendment refers to "a universe of rights, possessed by the peoplelatent rights, still to be evoked and enacted into law ... a reservoir of other, unenumerated rights that the people retain, which in time may be enacted into law". Similarly, journalist Brian Doherty has argued that the Ninth Amendment "specifically roots the Constitution in a natural rights tradition that says we are born with more rights than any constitution could ever list or specify."

Robert Bork, often considered an originalist, stated during his Supreme Court confirmation hearing that a judge should not apply a constitutional provision like this one if he does not know what it means; the example Bork then gave was a clause covered by an inkblot. Upon further study, Bork later ascribed a meaning to the Ninth Amendment in his book The Tempting of America. In that book, Bork subscribed to the interpretation of constitutional historian Russell Caplan, who asserted that this Amendment was meant to ensure that the federal Bill of Rights would not affect provisions in state law that restrain state governments.

A libertarian originalist, Randy Barnett has argued that the Ninth Amendment requires what he calls a presumption of liberty. Barnett also argues that the Ninth Amendment prevents the government from invalidating a ruling by either a jury or lower court through strict interpretation of the Bill of Rights. According to Barnett, "The purpose of the Ninth Amendment was to ensure that all individual natural rights had the same stature and force after some of them were enumerated as they had before."

According to professor and former Circuit Judge Michael W. McConnell,

Still others, such as Thomas B. McAffee, have argued that the Ninth Amendment protects the unenumerated "residuum" of rights which the federal government was never empowered to violate.

According to lawyer and diplomat Frederic Jesup Stimson, the framers of the Constitution and the Ninth Amendment intended that no rights that they already held would be lost through omission. Law professor Charles Lund Black took a similar position, though Stimson and Black respectively acknowledged that their views differed from the modern view, and differed from the prevalent view in academic writing.

Gun rights activists in recent decades have sometimes argued for a fundamental natural right to keep and bear arms in the United States that both predates the U.S. Constitution and is covered by the Constitution's Ninth Amendment; according to this viewpoint, the Second Amendment only enumerates a pre-existing right to keep and bear arms.

See also

 Constitutionalism
 Exception that proves the rule
 Negative liberty
 Tenth Amendment to the United States Constitution

Footnotes

Further reading

Books

Articles

 Barnett, Randy. "The Ninth Amendment: It Means What It Says", Texas Law Review, Vol. 85, p. 1 (2006). 
 Barnett, Randy. "Kurt Lash's Majoritarian Difficulty", Stanford Law Review, Vol. 60 (2008).
 Lash, Kurt. "The Lost Original Meaning of the Ninth Amendment", Texas Law Review, Vol. 83 (2004).
 Lash, Kurt. "The Lost Jurisprudence of the Ninth Amendment", Texas Law Review, Vol. 83 (2005).
 Lash, Kurt. "A Textual-Historical Theory of the Ninth Amendment", Stanford Law Review, Vol. 60, p. 906 (2008).
 McConnell, Michael. "The Ninth Amendment in Light of Text and History ", Cato Supreme Court Review 13 (2009–2010).
 Williams, Ryan. "The Ninth Amendment as a Rule of Construction", Columbia Law Review, Vol. 111, p. 498 (2011).

External links

 "CRS Annotated Constitution: 9th Amendment" by the Congressional Research Service (2000)
 "Proposed Amendments to the Constitution" by James Madison (1789)
 "Bill of Rights Institute: Ninth Amendment"

1791 in American law
09
1791 in American politics